Rankings of universities in Canada are typically published annually by a variety of nationally, and internationally based publications. Rankings of post-secondary institutions have most often been conducted by magazines, newspapers, websites, governments, or academia. Ranking are established to help inform potential applicants about universities in Canada based on a range of criteria, including student body characteristics, classes, faculty, finances, library, and reputation. Various rankings consider combinations of factors, including funding and endowment, research excellence and/or influence, specialization expertise, admissions, student options, award numbers, internationalization, graduate employment, industrial linkage, historical reputation and other criteria. Various rankings also evaluate universities based on research output.

Several Canadian-based publication have produced rankings of universities in Canada, the most prominent being the news magazine Maclean's under the name Guide to Canadian Universities which began in 1991. Canadian-based publications have generally limited their rankings to only universities in Canada. Several universities in Canada have also placed in rankings which includes other universities from around the world; including the Academic Ranking of World Universities, QS World University Rankings, the Times Higher Education World University Rankings, and the U.S. News & World Report Best Global University Ranking.

International rankings

Bibliometric-based rankings
Bibliometric rankings are based on citation analysis, evaluating the impact a university has on specialized journals and other academic publications. Bibliometrics is a field of statistics used to provide quantitative analysis of academic literature. Annual international rankings of this nature include the Academic Ranking of World Universities, published by the Shanghai Ranking Consultancy; the Performance Ranking of Scientific Papers for World Universities, published by the National Taiwan University; and University Ranking by Academic Performance, published by the Middle East Technical University. Although these rankings attempt to provide a quantitative analysis of a university's academic performance, differences in methodologies, and weighting of factors differentiates these rankings.

The following table includes Canadian universities, and their most recent global rank (up to the top 1000) in the aforementioned publications (with national ranks in parenthesis):

Opinion-based rankings
A number of international publications formulate their rankings using the weighted average of opinions gathered in surveys, including Quacquarelli Symonds's World University Ranking, The Times Higher Education World University Ranking, and the U.S. News & World Report's Best Global University Ranking. The methodologies used in these rankings differ amongst one another, although most opinion-based rankings use opinion surveys to evaluate a university's rank. Those surveyed typically includes members of academia, and the business community. In addition to opinion surveys, the following publications also use a quantitative measure of a university's academic performance, similar to bibliometric-based rankings. However, in contrast to bibliometric rankings, the quantitative results are used alongside the qualitative results gathered from opinion surveys.

The following table includes Canadian universities, and their most recent global rank in the aforementioned publications (with national ranks in parenthesis):

Other metrics
Webometrics Ranking of World Universities is biannual university ranking produced by Cybermetrics Lab. The webometrics rankings use link analysis in an effort to evaluate the institution's overall web presence, and accessibility.

National rankings

Opinion-based rankings
A number of Canadian-based publications have ranked universities in Canada. The most prominent of which is Maclean's, a Toronto-based news magazine that has published an annual rankings of Canadian universities since 1991. In addition to the Maclean's ranking, there are other Canadian-based publications that also rank Canadian universities. In 2012, the Toronto-based Higher Education Strategy Associates published a study ranking Canadian Universities based on research strength. The study ranks Canadian Universities in two broad fields: Science and Engineering, and Social Sciences and Humanities.

A number of nationally based organizations have also crafted ranking using input from students and alumni. In 2014, the Toronto-based CampusRanking.ca began publication of its annual Canadian University and College Rankings, focusing on undergraduate education. The student-generated rankings asked over 40,000 undergraduate students and alumni to rate their schools. The survey was done across 135 schools in Canada. This data was used to develop a school matching quiz, MatchU, where students are matched to schools based on their personality type and school preferences. In February 2017, University Magazine, based in Windsor and Edmonton, started publishing its list of Top 10 universities in Canada. University Magazine surveyed undergraduate and graduate students at 96 Canadian universities, using this information to rank the universities

Maclean's
Maclean's publishes an annual ranking of Canadian universities, intended to measure a university's overall "undergraduate experience". Universities are split into three categories: medical/doctoral, comprehensive, and undergraduate. Maclean's evaluates post-secondary institutions on a number of performance factors, such as awards collected, resources, reputation, as well as student satisfaction surveys. In addition to the medical/doctoral, comprehensive, and undergraduate university categories, the magazine also produces rankings for that focus on individual academic fields.

The Maclean's ranking of "medical/doctoral universities" includes universities that are heavily research-based, and have a broad range of graduate-level programs. Universities placed within Maclean's comprehensive rankings includes universities with a significant degree of research activity and a wide range of programs at the undergraduate, graduate, and professional levels. Universities placed in their primarily undergraduate rankings features universities that are smaller in size and offer fewer graduate programs than universities found in other categories. 

 

Maclean's medical/doctoral, comprehensive, and undergraduate annual rankings uses a number of performance factors to evaluate universities, including a reputational survey that accounts for 15 per cent of an institution's final score in the magazine's medical/doctoral, comprehensive, and undergraduate rankings. Respondents to the magazine's reputation survey includes university administrators and faculty, secondary school guidance counsellors, and members of the business community. In addition to using the information obtained from the reputational survey for its medical/comprehensive/undergraduate university rankings, Maclean's also publishes the results of the survey in the form of a reputational ranking. Maclean's reputational rankings rankgs institutions in several categories, including quality, innovation, and "leaders of tomorrow". The following are Maclean's overall reputational rankings:

Criticism
In September 2006, 26 Canadian universities, including several of Canada's largest universities such as the University of Alberta, University of British Columbia, Concordia University, Dalhousie University, McMaster University, Queen's University at Kingston, Université de Montréal, University of Ottawa, and the University of Toronto, refused to complete Maclean's questionnaire. In the same year, 11 Canadian universities issued a joint statement which described the rankings as "over-simplified and arbitrary," and criticized low response rates for its reputation surveys.

University of Alberta president Indira Samarasekera wrote that Maclean's initially filed a "Freedom of Information" request but that it was "too late" for the universities to respond. Samarasekera further stated, "Most of [the universities] had already posted the data online, and we directed Maclean's staff to our website. In instances where the magazine staff couldn’t find data on our website, they chose to use the previous year's data." Beginning with its 2007 rankings, the magazine gathered information previously obtained from the questionnaires from third-party, or other official sources and reports.

See also
 Higher education in Canada
 List of universities in Canada
 Maple League of Universities
 U15 Group of Canadian Research Universities

References
Notes

Works cited

Universities and colleges in Canada
University and college rankings